Carl Fredrik Malm (born 2 May 1977 in Stockholm) is a Swedish politician and Member of Parliament for the Liberal People's Party. He was chairperson of the Liberal Youth of Sweden from 2002 to 2006.

Political career 
Malm is known among his proponents as a champion of freedom, democracy and human rights worldwide, especially his support for an independent Kurdistan and for the democracy movements in totalitarian states such as Cuba. He started the project Cuba Free Library. In January 2006 he received the "Kurdish Friend of the Year"-award by the Kurdistan regional government. He is also known as an opponent of anti-semitism and all other forms of xenophobia. He has previously worked as an editor of the Swedish anti-racist magazine Expo, and as an editorialist for Upsala Nya Tidning, Eskilstuna-Kuriren, Gefle Dagblad and a couple of other liberal newspapers in Sweden.

Malm has expressed his support for the democracy movement in Iran, and is calling for tougher sanctions against the country, which he has been criticized for by Hans Linde, a member of the Left Party Since 2020, he has been serving as co-chair of the Inter-Parliamentary Alliance on China (IPAC).

Personal life 
Malm is married to Gulan Avci, Member of Parliament for the Liberal People's Party. Avci was chairperson of the Kurdish Youth of Sweden between 1998–2000 and is linked to Kurdish recognition of the Armenian genocide.

References

External links
Fredrik Malm – blog
Fredrik Malm – official website

1977 births
21st-century Swedish politicians
Living people
Members of the Riksdag from the Liberals (Sweden)
Members of the Riksdag 2006–2010
Members of the Riksdag 2010–2014
Members of the Riksdag 2014–2018
Members of the Riksdag 2018–2022
Members of the Riksdag 2022–2026
Swedish bloggers
Swedish journalists
Writers from Stockholm